Corporal Edward Dwyer, VC (25 November 1895 – 3 September 1916) was a British Army soldier and an English recipient of the Victoria Cross (VC), the highest award for gallantry in the face of the enemy that can be awarded to British and Commonwealth forces.

Early life
Dwyer was born in Fulham, London, on 25 November 1895.

First World War

Dwyer was 19 years old, and a private in the 1st Battalion, East Surrey Regiment, British Army during the First World War, when was awarded the VC for his actions on 20 April 1915 at Hill 60 in Belgium.

Dwyer was also awarded the Cross of St. George by Russia. He later achieved the rank of corporal. He was killed in action at Guillemont, France on 3 September 1916. His grave is located at Flatiron Copse Military Cemetery, France, which is 4 miles east of Albert (Plot III, Row J, Grave 3).

Apart from Jack Cornwell of the Royal Navy, Dwyer was the youngest VC recipient of the First World War.

His VC is displayed at the Princess of Wales' Royal Regiment (Queens and Royal Hampshires) Museum located in Dover Castle, Kent.

Recording
In 1916, Dwyer made an audio recording for the Regal record label in which he described taking part in the Retreat from Mons in the early days of the war. The monologue describes life at the front, pay and rations, and includes a sample of one of the songs sung by soldiers at the time. Both sides of the Regal disc (each lasting about 3 minutes) made for the British enlistment services are available on the archive audio collections Oh! It's a Lovely War (Vol 1) and Artists Rifles on CD41, which along with the Dwyer sides includes popular and patriotic songs, marches and descriptive sketch records. Dwyer's recording appears to be the only one made by a serving British soldier during the Great War, and as such is unique. Part of the recording was used in the 2003 documentary The First World War.

References

External links
Regimental website
Oh! It's A Lovely War CD liner notes at CD41

1895 births
1916 deaths
Burials in France
British Army personnel of World War I
British World War I recipients of the Victoria Cross
East Surrey Regiment soldiers
British military personnel killed in World War I
People from Fulham
British Army recipients of the Victoria Cross
Military personnel from London